FGI-103 is an antiviral drug developed as a potential treatment for the filoviruses Ebola virus and Marburg virus. In tests on mice FGI-103 was effective against both Ebola and Marburg viruses when administered up to 48 hours after infection. The mechanism of action of FGI-103 has however not yet been established, as it was found not to be acting by any of the known mechanisms used by similar antiviral drugs.

See also 
 FGI-104
 FGI-106
 LJ-001

References 

Antiviral drugs
Ebola
Experimental drugs
Benzimidazoles
Benzofurans